MSN primarily refers to the web portal MSN by Microsoft, but it may also refer to:

Microsoft
 MSN Dial-up, the Internet service provider (originally The Microsoft Network)
 Windows Live Messenger, once synonymous with 'MSN' in Internet slang
 List of services by MSN, a list that includes several services Microsoft has rebranded

Other
 Dane County Regional Airport (IATA airport code MSN) in Madison, Wisconsin
 Manufacturer's serial number, a unique identifier assigned by some manufacturers. The abbreviation is typically used by aircraft companies.
 Master of Science in Nursing
 Maquila Solidarity Network
 Medium spiny neuron
 Meeker Southern Railroad, which uses the reporting mark 'MSN'
Meter serial number
 Multiple Subscriber Number
 Mountaineer Sports Network, a former business identity of the West Virginia Radio Corporation
Lionel Messi, Luis Suárez and Neymar, dubbed "MSN", the main attacking trident of Spanish football club FC Barcelona from 2014 to 2017
 MSN, the human gene which produces the moesin protein
Majlis Sukan Negara Malaysia (MSN Malaysia), the National Sports Council of Malaysia

See also
MSM (disambiguation)